Arcadia High School is a public high school located in Greece, New York, serving grades 9–12. It is one of four high schools in the Greece Central School District. The school was built in 1963 and the new Arcadia Middle School was connected to it for the 1993 school year. Arcadia Middle School has the largest library in the district, which is shared by both the high and the middle school. The mascot of the school is "The Titan."

Enrollment 

NOTE: Enrollment data is from the 2009 - 2010 School Year

Athletics
Students at Arcadia High School are eligible to participate in the following sports programs.

Notable alumni

Dema Kovalenko-Class of 1996- Former MLS Soccer player
Jeff Sluman Class of 1975- Professional Golfer

See also
Greece Athena High School
Greece Olympia High School
Greece Odyssey Academy

References

External links
Greece Arcadia High School Website
Greece Central School District Website

Public high schools in New York (state)
High schools in Monroe County, New York